Justin Harper is the name of:
Justin Harper (American football) (born 1985), American football player
Justin Harper (basketball) (born 1989), American basketball player